The Elijah P. Curtis House is a historic house located at 405 Market Street in Metropolis, Illinois. The Classical Revival house was built in 1870 for Elijah P. Curtis. The house was added to the National Register of Historic Places in 1978 and now houses the Massac County Historical Museum.

History
Born in 1834, Elijah P. Curtis settled in Massac County at a young age. Curtis earned his law degree in 1860 and practiced law prior to the outset of the Civil War. After the war began, Curtis and two other men organized the first volunteer Union regiment from Massac County. In 1863, Curtis was promoted to the rank of major. Curtis continued his work as a lawyer after the war.

Curtis commissioned his historic house in 1870. The house's builder, Joseph P. Farrell, was a local artisan renowned for the quality of his work. The house remains well-preserved and was added to the National Register of Historic Places on June 9, 1978. The Massac County Historical Society currently owns the home, which it uses as the Massac County Historical Museum.

Architecture
The Curtis House is a two-story brick building designed in the Classical Revival style. A two-story entrance portico dominates the front facade of the home. The portico is supported by octagonal columns, features a porch with a balustrade on both stories and is topped by a triangular pediment. The first and second story entrance feature identical doorways with transoms, sidelights, and flanking pilasters. Two double-hung six-over-six windows are located on both stories on each side of the portico; the windows are separated by brick pilasters. The house's interior has a symmetrical plan with two main rooms on each floor and a central foyer and staircase.

References

External links

 Massac County Historical Society - Southern Illinois Association of Museums

Houses on the National Register of Historic Places in Illinois
Neoclassical architecture in Illinois
Houses completed in 1870
Houses in Massac County, Illinois
Museums in Massac County, Illinois
Historic house museums in Illinois
National Register of Historic Places in Massac County, Illinois